August Kayser (born Strasbourg, France; February 14, 1821 – June 17, 1885) was a Protestant theologian.

For some years, Kayser was an assistant librarian at the University of Strasbourg. He was a private tutor from 1843 to 1855, and accepted a call to be a preacher to Stossweiler in 1858. In 1868 Kayser went to Neuhof, Alsace. He was appointed professor of theology in Strasbourg in 1873.

Kayser belonged to the so-called liberal Protestants, and contributed largely to the Revue de Theologie. He published De Justini Martyris and Doctrina (Strasbourg, 1850), but his main work was Das Vorexilische Buch der Urgeschichte Israels und Seine Erweiterungen (1874).

French librarians
1821 births
1885 deaths
Academic staff of the University of Strasbourg